Mui Siu-ching (born September 27, 1953) is a Hong Kong television producer for a long time associated with television station TVB, beginning her career as a producer with rival broadcaster ATV she moved to TVB in 1987 and has since then been responsible for numerous series including well received series such as The Breaking Point, The Legendary Ranger, Where the Legend Begins, Family Man, Shine on You, the Forensic Heroes franchise, Beyond the Realm of Conscience & Deep in the Realm of Conscience. Believing that popular television can touch and influence the populace in Hong Kong, her series revolve around the themes of good and evil.

Her younger sister is the TVB actress and television host Cutie Mui, and her husband is fellow TVB producer Lau Kar-ho. In March 2012, she ended her 25-year association with TVB when both she and her husband signed to rival station Now TV. In 2016, she returned to TVB with her husband. In February 2020, she announced her retirement.

Work as a producer

Rediffusion Television series

1980s

Asia Television Limited series

1980s

TVB series

1980s

1990s

2000s

2010s

2020s

Awards
 2010 Ming Pao outstanding crew award for Can't Buy Me Love

References
The content of this article is based on that from the corresponding article on the Chinese Wikipedia.

TVB producers
Living people
1953 births